Attambelos II was a king of Characene, a Parthian vassal state and important trading port on the Persian Gulf. His rule was from 17/16 to 9/8BC.

He is known only from his coins, which have been found as far away as Susa and on Failaka Island in the Persian Gulf.
His Tetradrachms have a low silver content and like almost all Characene coinage show the kings likeness on the front and Heracles on the reverse.

His bronze coins show a Nike on the reverse.

References

Kings of Characene
1st-century BC monarchs in the Middle East
Year of birth missing
1st-century deaths
Year of death missing